Jacob Bowman Tobacco Warehouse is a historic tobacco warehouse located at Lancaster, Lancaster County, Pennsylvania. It was built in 1906, and is a four-story, rectangular brick building over a raised basement.  It is five bays wide and between 60 and 75 feet deep.

It was listed on the National Register of Historic Places in 1990.

References

Industrial buildings and structures on the National Register of Historic Places in Pennsylvania
Industrial buildings completed in 1906
Buildings and structures in Lancaster, Pennsylvania
Tobacco buildings in the United States
National Register of Historic Places in Lancaster, Pennsylvania
1906 establishments in Pennsylvania